Carl Edvard Rotwitt (2 March 1812 – 8 February 1860) was a Danish jurist and politician. He served as the Prime Minister of Denmark 1859–1860. He died while in office only 47 years old.

Biography 
Rotwitt was born at Hillerød, Denmark. He was the son of Otto Johan Rotwitt (1766-1836).  He became a student at Frederiksborg Latin School in 1828 and took a legal exam in 1833.

In 1836 he became a prosecutor in Thisted, in 1841 Land Commissioner and Commissioner and at the end of 1842 Supreme Court Attorney. 
Rotwitt was elected to the Folketing in 1849 and served  as chairman from 1853 until 1859. Rotwitt had become Knight in the Order of the Dannebrog in 1853.

References

Other sources
Alastair H. Thomas (2016) Historical Dictionary of Denmark (Rowman & Littlefield) 

1812 births
1860 deaths
Danish Justice Ministers
Prime Ministers of Denmark
Speakers of the Folketing
Knights of the Order of the Dannebrog
Burials at Assistens Cemetery (Copenhagen)
People from Hillerød Municipality